Valittu kansa is the twelfth studio album by Finnish pop singer Antti Tuisku, released on 7 February 2020 through Warner Music Finland. The album received positive reviews from critics; Oskari Onninen from Helsingin Sanomat called it "an exceptional Finnish pop effort and a five-star album", while Jukka Hätinen, writing for Rumba, described it as "a provocative pop diamond".

In its first week of release, the album entered the Finnish Albums Chart at number one, becoming Tuisku's sixth number-one album.

Track listing

Charts

Release history

See also
List of 2020 albums
List of number-one albums of 2020 (Finland)

References

2020 albums
Antti Tuisku albums
Finnish-language albums
Warner Music Group albums